Thomas Parkin (5 February 1902–1984) was an English footballer who played in the Football League for Coventry City, Durham City, Exeter City and Merthyr Town.

References

1902 births
1984 deaths
English footballers
Association football forwards
English Football League players
North Shields F.C. players
Wallsend Boys Club players
Coventry City F.C. players
Durham City A.F.C. players
Exeter City F.C. players
Merthyr Town F.C. players
Yeovil Town F.C. players
Weymouth F.C. players